Yongdae Gap ("Dragon-Terrace Cape") is a North Korean headland in the middle of the country's eastern coast along the Sea of Japan. It forms the southeastern corner of South Hamgyong's Tanchon and the western point of a narrow bay sheltering Songjin and Hwadae.

Names

Geography

Lighthouse
Yongdae Gap has a lighthouse, but it is closed to the public and the American National Geospatial-Intelligence Agency notes that "the existence and operation of all navigational aids should be considered unreliable on the east coast of North Korea".

See also
		
 Yongdae, its namesake village
 List of lighthouses in North Korea

References

Citations

Bibliography
 .

External links
 , a topographical map of the area around Yongdae Gap.

Headlands of North Korea
Landforms of South Hamgyong
Lighthouses in North Korea